Alsophila walkerae, synonym Cyathea walkerae, is a species of tree fern endemic to Sri Lanka, where it grows in wetland forests.

References

External links
Researches
The World Ferns

walkerae
Ferns of Asia
Endemic flora of Sri Lanka